United Nations Security Council Resolution 2022 was unanimously adopted on 2 December 2011, after recalling resolutions 2009 (2011).

Resolution 

Stressing the importance of continued United Nations support for Libya’s transitional Government in addressing immediate priorities, the Security Council today extended the mandate of the United Nations Support Mission in Libya (UNSMIL) until 16 March 2012.

Unanimously adopting resolution 2022 (2011), the Council also decided that UNSMIL’s mandate should include, in coordination and consultation with the transitional Government, assisting and supporting national efforts to address the threat of proliferation of all arms and related material, in particular man-portable surface to air missiles.

Established by Council resolution 2009 (2011) of 16 September for an initial period of three months, the Mission’s original mandate was to help Libyan national efforts to restore public security, promote the rule of law, foster inclusive political dialogue and national reconciliation, and embark on constitution-making and electoral processes.

See also 
List of United Nations Security Council Resolutions 2001 to 2100

References

External links 
Full text of UNSCR 2022

 2022
United Nations Security Council resolutions concerning Libya
2011 in Libya
December 2011 events